This list of botanical gardens and arboretums in South Dakota is intended to include all significant botanical gardens and arboretums in the U.S. state of South Dakota

See also
List of botanical gardens and arboretums in the United States

References 

 
Arboreta in South Dakota
botanical gardens and arboretums in South Dakota